Nanodea is a monotypic genus of flowering plants belonging to the family Santalaceae. The only species is Nanodea muscosa.

Its native range is Southern South America, Falkland Islands.

References

Santalaceae
Monotypic Santalales genera
Taxa named by Joseph Banks
Taxa named by Karl Friedrich von Gaertner